The 7th NKP Salve Challenger Trophy was an Indian domestic cricket tournament that was held in Chennai from 12 February to 15 February 2001. The series involved the domestic and national players from India who were allocated in India Seniors, India A, and India B. India Seniors defeated India A by 4 wickets in the final to become the champions of the tournament.

Squads

 Robin Singh was asked to lead India B instead of Sachin Tendulkar, after he chose not to captain the side and contribute as a player instead.

Points Table

Matches

Group stage

Final

References

Indian domestic cricket competitions